Louis W. "Jumbo" Schoeneck (March 3, 1862 – January 20, 1930) was a Major League Baseball first baseman. He played for the Chicago Browns/Pittsburgh Stogies and Baltimore Monumentals, both of the Union Association, and for the National League Indianapolis Hoosiers (–).

Schoeneck was an average fielder and a good hitter during his major league career. His best season was 1884 when he finished in the league top ten in several offensive categories, including hits (131), batting average (.308), on-base percentage (.320), and slugging percentage (.387). Schoeneck's inflated statistics in 1884 are at least partly due to the weak competition of the Union Association, as compared to all of the other major leagues.

In his three major league seasons (170 games), Schoeneck was 186-for-657 (.283) with 79 runs scored. He pitched in two games for the 1888 Hoosiers and finished both, for a total of 4.1 innings, and allowed no earned runs.

Schoeneck died in his hometown of Chicago at the age of 67, and was buried at Mount Emblem Cemetery in Elmhurst, Illinois.

External links

Baseball Almanac

1862 births
1930 deaths
19th-century baseball players
Major League Baseball first basemen
Chicago Browns/Pittsburgh Stogies players
Baltimore Monumentals players
Indianapolis Hoosiers (NL) players
Springfield, Illinois (minor league baseball) players
Newark Domestics players
Milwaukee Brewers (minor league) players
Portland (minor league baseball) players
Chicago Maroons players
New Haven (minor league baseball) players
Seattle (minor league baseball) players
Green Bay Bays players
Rochester Flour Cities players
Sportspeople from Chicago
Burials in Illinois